Mota Coqueiro, ou A Pena de Morte (in ) is a 1877 novel by Brazilian journalist and writer José do Patrocínio. It is a semi-fictitious account of the life of the farmer Manuel da Mota Coqueiro, also known as "The Beast of Macabu", who was sentenced to hanging in 1852 for a crime he did not commit and executed March 6, 1855 in Macaé, RJ.

External links
The full book online 

1877 Brazilian novels